Banbury is a surname. The surname was first found in Oxfordshire, in Banbury, a civil parish and market town on the River Cherwell, which is now in the Cherwell District. The derivation is from the pre-7th Century Old English personal name "Ban(na)a" and "burh", meaning "Banna's fort" or fortified manor.

Notable people with the surname include:

 Blake Banbury, Canadian two-time Directors Guild of Canada Award nominated director, known for his work on 40 Days and 40 Nights (2002), Elf (2003) and The Deadly Pledge (2007)
 Fred Everest Banbury (1893–1918), Canadian flying ace during World War I
 Frederick Banbury, 1st Baron Banbury of Southam (1850–1936), British businessman, Conservative Member of Parliament
 Frith Banbury (1912–2008), British actor
 Jabez Banbury (1830–1900), British-born American Civil War veteran
 Jen Banbury (21st century), American playwright & author
 John Banbury (disambiguation), multiple people
 Quince Banbury (1883–1956), American football player and coach
 The Earl of Banbury (1547–1632), colonel of the foot regiments enrolled to assist the Armada
 Ian Banbury, (born 27 November 1957), UK cyclist

References

English toponymic surnames